The Old Baker County Courthouse, now the Emily Taber Public Library, was built in 1908. It is at 14 McIver Avenue West in Macclenny, Florida. It was designed by Edward Columbus Hosford of Eastman, Georgia. In 1986 it was added to the U.S. National Register of Historic Places.

It was deemed "significant for its architecture and its association with architect Edward C. Hosford, who was responsible for designing a number of county courthouses in both Florida and Georgia during the 1906-1910 period. Built in the 'up-to-date' eclectic Colonial Revival style, the structure represented the pride of the county's citizens in the evolution of the local economy from subsistence farms to one based on commercial exploitation of agriculture."

It has also been known as the Baker County Free Public Library and  the  Peg McCollum Building.

References

External links
 Baker County listings at National Register of Historic Places
 Florida's Office of Cultural and Historical Programs
 Baker County listings
 Emily Taber Public Library
 Baker County history
 Baker County Courthouse at Florida's Historic Courthouses
 Florida's Historic Courthouses by Hampton Dunn

Buildings and structures in Baker County, Florida
County courthouses in Florida
Courthouses on the National Register of Historic Places in Florida
Edward Columbus Hosford buildings
Neoclassical architecture in Florida
Clock towers in Florida
1908 establishments in Florida
National Register of Historic Places in Baker County, Florida
Libraries in Florida
Government buildings completed in 1908